Shikaft-e Golgol-Gulgul (or Gulgulcave or Golgolcave) site is an  Assyrian rock relief and inscription located in the vicinity of Gulgul, گل گل a village near Mount Pushta-e Kuh at Ilam in Iran. It was discovered by Louis Vanden Berghe (Ghent University, Royal Museums of Art and History, Brussels). The rock-carved relief is attributed to Esarhaddon. The sovereign depicted is wearing an Assyrian tiara, dressed in a tunic with only the feet appearing, and wearing earrings. He is armed with a sword, worn on a belt, and holding a mace in his left hand. The right arm is broken and seems to hold an object. On both sides of the king, divine symbols are represented. They include to the left; a full moon, the seven planets and the sun-disk symbol Ishtar. At right a winged disk and a horned tiara are identified as symbols of Shamash and Assyria. An inscription is also visible.

It is oblong shaped with 130X90 centimeters dimensions. Its height from the ground stands at 270 centimeters. On the inscription there is an engraving of an Assyrian soldier with a helmet, holding an arrow, with a moon and a star above his head and on the lower section of this inscription, several sentences in cuneiform language have been engraved which were translated by Mr. Vandenberg in 1973 AD. These sentences refer to the conquest of Elam and Lorestan by the Assyrians.

See also
Bit-Istar
Tang-i Var

References

Reade,  J.E. 1977. Shikaft-i Gulgul: its date and symbolism. Iranica Antiqua 12: 33-44. Leiden
Vanden Berghe, L., 1984 Reliefs rupestres de l’Iran ancien, musée royaux d’art et d’histoire, Bruxelles, 208pp.

Rock art in Asia
Buildings and structures in Ilam Province
Assyrian art and architecture
Sculpture of the Ancient Near East
Tourist attractions in Ilam Province
Rock reliefs in Iran